Elvin Ibrisimovic (born 19 April 1999) is an Austrian professional footballer who plays as a forward for Austrian Second League club FC Dornbirn, on loan from Vaduz.

Career
A youth product of Bregenz, Ibrisimovic started his career with the club before joining FC Hard for the 2017–18 season. He moved to Wacker Innsbruck in the summer of 2018. Ibrisimovic made his professional debut with Wacker Innsbruck II in a 0–0 Austrian 2. Liga tie with SKU Amstetten on 5 August 2018. He transferred to FC Vaduz in the Swiss Super League on 22 December 2020.

References

External links
 
 SFL Profile
 OEFB profile

1999 births
Living people
People from Bregenz
Austrian footballers
Austria youth international footballers
Association football forwards
FC Vaduz players
FC Wacker Innsbruck (2002) players
FC Dornbirn 1913 players
Swiss Super League players
2. Liga (Austria) players
Austrian Regionalliga players
Austrian Landesliga players
Austrian expatriate footballers
Austrian expatriate sportspeople in Liechtenstein
Expatriate footballers in Liechtenstein
Footballers from Vorarlberg